Diplous is a genus of ground beetles in the family Carabidae. There are more than 20 described species in Diplous.

Species
These 23 species belong to the genus Diplous:

 Diplous aterrimus (Dejean, 1828)  (North America)
 Diplous californicus (Motschulsky, 1844)  (North America)
 Diplous davidis (Fairmaire, 1891)  (China)
 Diplous depressus (Gebler, 1830)  (East Asia)
 Diplous filicornis (Casey, 1918)  (North America)
 Diplous gansuensis Jedlicka, 1932  (China)
 Diplous giacomazzoi Zamotajlov & Sciaky, 1996  (China)
 Diplous grummi Zamotajlov & Kryzhanovskij, 1990  (China)
 Diplous jedlickai Zamotajlov, 1996  (China)
 Diplous julonshanensis Zamotajlov, 1993  (China)
 Diplous nortoni Andrewes, 1930  (China)
 Diplous petrogorbatschevi Zamotajlov, 1996  (China)
 Diplous przewalskii (Semenov, 1889)  (China)
 Diplous rugicollis (Randall, 1838)  (North America)
 Diplous sciakyi Zamotajlov, 1996  (China)
 Diplous sibiricus (Motschulsky, 1844)  (Palearctic)
 Diplous sterbai Jedlicka, 1932  (China)
 Diplous szetschuanus Jedlicka, 1932  (China)
 Diplous taiwanicus Terada; Yeh & Wu, 2013  (Taiwan and temperate Asia)
 Diplous tonggulensis Zamotajlov & Sciaky, 1996  (China)
 Diplous wrasei Zamotajlov & Sciaky, 1996  (China)
 Diplous wulanensis Zamotajlov, 1998  (China)
 Diplous yunnanus Jedlicka, 1932  (China)

References

External links

 

Carabidae